Bennell is a surname. Notable people with the name include:

Eddie Bennell (1939–1991), Australian playwright, prose writer, and boxer
Harley Bennell (born 1992), Australian rules footballer
Jamie Bennell (born 1990), Australian rules footballer

Fictional
Carol Bennell in the film The Invasion
Dr Miles Bennell in the film Invasion of the Body Snatchers